Georg Gottfried Julius Dehio (22 November 1850 in Reval (now Tallinn), Governorate of Estonia, Russian Empire – 21 March 1932 in Tübingen), was a Baltic German art historian.

In 1900, Dehio started the "Handbuch der deutschen Kunstgeschichte" (Handbook of German Art History), published by Ernst Wasmuth. The project is ongoing and managed by the 'Dehio-Vereinigung', Munich.

He is the namesake of the Georg Dehio Prize (Georg Dehio Book Prize).

He was laureate of the Pour le Mérite order ("Pour le Mérite für Wissenschaften und Künste"), the Eagle Shield of the German Empire (Adlerschild des Deutschen Reiches) and the Bavarian Maximilian Order for Science and Art. He held honorary doctor titles in Göttingen, Tübingen, Frankfurt (Main) and Darmstadt. The minor planet 48415 Dehio discovered circa 1987, is named after him.

See also 
 Karl Gottfried Konstantin Dehio (27 May 1851, Reval (Tallinn) – 26 February 1927, Dorpat (Tartu)), internist, cousin
 Ludwig Dehio (25 August 1888, Königsberg, Prussia – 24 October 1963, Marburg/Lahn), historian, his son
 Erhard Arnold Julius Dehio (16 January 1855, Reval (Tallinn) – 12 July 1940, Bad Oeynhausen), last German mayor of Reval, Georg's younger brother
 Georg Dehio Book Prize
 Georg Dehio Cultural Prize

References

External links

 
 
Céline Trautmann-Waller: Alois Riegl (1858–1905). In: Michel Espagne und Bénédicte Savoy (Hrsg.). Dictionnaire des historiens d'art allemands. CNRS Editions, Paris 2010, S. 217–228; 405.
 Georg Dehio in: BBLD – Baltisches biografisches Lexikon digital (source in German)
 

1850 births
1932 deaths
People from Tallinn
People from Kreis Harrien
Baltic-German people
German art historians
German male non-fiction writers
Academic staff of the University of Strasbourg
Recipients of the Pour le Mérite (civil class)